Neikrug is a surname. Notable people with the surname include:

Arianna Neikrug (born 1993), American jazz singer, songwriter, and arranger
Marc Neikrug (born 1946),  American composer, pianist, and conductor